Annemie Schneider is a former German paralympic athlete, that won 8 medals (5 gold) at the Winter Paralympics.

During 2006 Winter Paralympics were inducted into Paralympic Hall of Fame.

Biography
Her category was LW2 (above-the-knee amputation).

See also
West Germany at the 1976 Winter Paralympics

References

External links
 Athlete profile at IPC web site
 Athlete profile at Paralympic Hall of Fame home page

Living people
Paralympic alpine skiers of Germany
Alpine skiers at the 1976 Winter Paralympics
Alpine skiers at the 1980 Winter Paralympics
Alpine skiers at the 1984 Winter Paralympics
Alpine skiers at the 1988 Winter Paralympics
Alpine skiers at the 1992 Winter Paralympics
Alpine skiers at the 1994 Winter Paralympics
Paralympic gold medalists for Germany
Paralympic silver medalists for Germany
Paralympic bronze medalists for Germany
Medalists at the 1976 Winter Paralympics
Medalists at the 1980 Winter Paralympics
Medalists at the 1988 Winter Paralympics
Medalists at the 1994 Winter Paralympics
German female alpine skiers
Year of birth missing (living people)
Paralympic medalists in alpine skiing
20th-century German women